The Seudat Chiyat HaMatim, a Hebrew term, is a  Seudah (feast) for the righteous following the Chiyat Hamatim, the bodily Resurrection of the dead, which is referred to in a passage of the Talmud in the section on Passover which alludes to a relationship between the Passover Seder and this other feast of life and freedom. Rabbi Avira interpreted the biblical passage

And the child was weaned, and Abraham made a great feast on the day Isaac was weaned (Genesis 21:8)

as alluding to this feast. 

According to Rav Avira, at the Birkat HaMazon (Grace after Meals) following this feast, the Cup of Blessing will be passed from Abraham to Isaac to Jacob to Moses to Joshua, each of whom will cite some sin or imperfection and claim unworthiness to lead the blessing. The cup will then pass to King David, who will take it and lead the Birkat HaMazon. The Rabbis cite the verse "I shall raise the cup of salvation, and call upon the name of the Lord" (Psalms 16:13) as support.  This section of the Talmud does not report what King David will say. Belief in bodily resurrection is a tenet of Orthodox Judaism.

According to Midrash, three mythical beasts mentioned in the Hebrew Bible, the bird Ziz, the animal Behemoth, and the sea-creature Leviathan will be served at the feast.

Some Modern Orthodox Jews have revived a millennium-old custom of adding a piece of fish to the Passover Seder plate, with the lamb, egg and fish jointly symbolizing the three prophets (Moses, Aharon, and Miriam) referred to in Micah 6:4, as well as the three mythical beasts associated with the Seudat Chiyat HaMatim, which the Passover Seder, and the Cup of Elijah allude to. The added fish represents Leviathan as well as Miriam and is also a water symbol. An egg  and shankbone (for Moses/Ziz/air and Aharon/Behemoth/earth) are already on the standard Seder plate. The contemporary revival of this existing traditional custom, which honors a female figure in a highly traditional context, is favored by some Orthodox Jewish Feminists as preferable to developing new customs honoring Miriam or other female leaders. 

A belief in a bodily resurrection of the dead, one of Maimonides Thirteen Principles of Faith, is a normative belief of Orthodox Judaism and a traditional belief of Conservative Judaism. However, Aggadic and Midrashic elements of the Talmud are often interpreted as representing allegorical symbolism within Orthodox Judaism (and generally so in more liberal branches).

See also
Seudat mitzvah

References

The Schottenstein Edition of the Babylonian Talmud, Tractate Pesachim, Mesorah Publications Ltd., 119b (Pesachim 119b).
Yael Levine, YNet News, Where is Miriam on the Seder plate?

Talmudic mythology
Hebrew words and phrases
Mythological food and drink
Jewish eschatology